Omertà is a Southern Italian code of silence and code of honor and conduct that places importance on silence in the face of questioning by authorities or outsiders; non-cooperation with authorities, the government, or outsiders, especially during criminal investigations; and willfully ignoring and generally avoiding interference with the illegal activities of others (i.e., not contacting law enforcement or the authorities when one is aware of, witness to, or even the victim of certain crimes). It originated and remains common in Southern Italy, where banditry or brigandage and Mafia-type criminal organizations (like the Camorra, Cosa Nostra, 'Ndrangheta, Sacra Corona Unita and Società foggiana) have long been strong. Similar codes are also deeply rooted in other areas of the Mediterranean, including Malta, Crete in Greece, and Corsica, all of which share a common or similar historic culture with Southern Italy.

Retaliation against informers is common in criminal circles, where they are often described by terms such as "rats" or "snitches".

Code
According to the Oxford English Dictionary, the phonology of the word indicates that it is not of Sicilian origin; it may derive from the now rare Spanish word , meaning manliness, after the Sicilian word omu "man". It has also been suggested that the word comes from Latin  (humility), which became umiltà and then finally omertà in some southern Italian dialects; this suggestion is not well supported by the geographical distribution of the word. The first Antimafia Commission of the Italian parliament in the 1970s accepted the origin based on omu on the authority of Antonio Cutrera, with no reference to Spanish.

The basic principle of omertà is that one must not seek aid from legally constituted authorities to settle personal grievances. A person who has been wronged is obligated to look out for their own interests by avenging the wrong himself, or finding a patron—not the state—to avenge him.

Omertà implies "the categorical prohibition of cooperation with state authorities or reliance on its services, even when one has been victim of a crime." A person should absolutely avoid interfering in the business of others and should not inform the authorities of a crime under any circumstances, but if it is justified, he may personally avenge a physical attack on himself or on his family by vendetta, literally a taking of revenge, a feud. Even if somebody is convicted of a crime that he has not committed, he is supposed to serve the sentence rather than give the police information about the real criminal, even if the criminal has nothing to do with the Mafia. Within Mafia culture, breaking omertà is punishable by death.

Omertà is an extreme form of loyalty and solidarity in the face of authority. One of its absolute tenets is that it is deeply demeaning and shameful to betray even one's deadliest enemy to the authorities. For that reason, many Mafia-related crimes go unsolved. Observers of the Mafia debate whether omertà should best be understood as an expression of social consensus for the Mafia or whether it is instead a pragmatic response based primarily on fear, as implied by a popular Sicilian proverb: "Cu è surdu, orbu e taci, campa cent'anni 'mpaci" ("He who is deaf, blind and silent will live a hundred years in peace").

It has also been described as follows: "Whoever appeals to the law against his fellow man is either a fool or a coward. Whoever cannot take care of himself without police protection is both. It is as cowardly to betray an offender to justice, even though his offences be against yourself, as it is not to avenge an injury by violence. It is dastardly and contemptible in a wounded man to betray the name of his assailant, because if he recovers, he must naturally expect to take vengeance himself."

History
Omertà is a code of silence, according to one of the first Mafia researchers Antonio Cutrera, a former officer of public security. It seals lips of men even in their own defense and even when the accused is innocent of charged crimes. Cutrera quoted a native saying which was first uttered (as goes the legend) by a wounded man to his assailant: "If I live, I'll kill you. If I die, I forgive you."

Sicilians adopted the code long before the emergence of Cosa Nostra, and it may have been heavily influenced by centuries of state oppression and foreign domination. It has been observed at least as far back as the 16th century as a way of opposing Spanish rule.

The Italian-American mafioso Joseph Valachi famously broke the omertà code in 1963, when he publicly spoke out about the existence of the Mafia and testified before a United States Senate committee. He became the first in the modern history of the Italian-American Mafia to break his blood oath. In Sicily, the phenomenon of pentito (Italian he who has repented) broke omertà.

Among the most famous Mafia pentiti is Tommaso Buscetta, the first important witness in Italy, who both helped prosecutor Giovanni Falcone to understand the inner workings of Cosa Nostra and described the Sicilian Mafia Commission or Cupola, the leadership of the Sicilian Mafia. A predecessor, Leonardo Vitale, who gave himself up to the police in 1973, was judged mentally ill and so his testimony led to the conviction of only himself and his uncle.

In sport

Omertà is widely reported in sport in relation to use of prohibited substances by athletes. The Cycling Independent Reform Commission report of 2015 contains the word "omerta" no fewer than 17 times, and stated:

In popular culture

Mario Puzo wrote novels based on the principles of omertà and the Cosa Nostra. His best known works in that vein are the trilogy The Godfather (1969), The Sicilian (1984), and Omertà (2000).

The 2010 videogame Fallout: New Vegas features a tribe of gangsters called the Omertas. The 2002 videogame Mafia names its campaign's tenth chapter "Omerta".

Swedish metal band Katatonia released a song titled "Omerta" on their 2003 album Viva Emptiness, detailling the fictional killing of a mafia informant who had broken omertà. American heavy metal band Lamb of God also released a song titled "Omerta" from their third studio album Ashes of the Wake (2004), which begins with lead singer Randy Blythe performing a spoken word description of omertà. 

In 2019, Canadian rapper Drake released a song called "Omertà" in the extended play The Best in the World Pack.

See also

 
 Code of silence
 Kayfabe
 Mesirah
 Stop Snitchin'
 Anatomy of a Scandal – 2022 television miniseries

Explanatory notes

References

Citations

General sources 

 Blok, Anton (1988 [1974]). The Mafia of a Sicilian Village, 1860–1960: A study of violent peasant entrepreneurs, Long Grove (Illinois): Waveland Press 
 Nelli, Humbert S. (1981 [1976]). The Business of Crime: Italians and Syndicate Crime in the United States, Chicago: The University of Chicago Press 
 Paoli, Letizia (2003). Mafia Brotherhoods: Organized Crime, Italian Style, Oxford/New York: Oxford University Press 
 Porrello, Rick (1995). The Rise and Fall of the Cleveland Mafia: Corn Sugar and Blood, New York: Barricade books 
 Servadio, Gaia (1976). Mafioso: A history of the Mafia from its origins to the present day, London: Secker & Warburg 

American Mafia
Codes of conduct
History of the 'Ndrangheta
History of the Camorra in Italy
History of the Sicilian Mafia
Italian words and phrases
Organized crime terminology
Secrecy
Silence